Amidol is a colorless crystalline compound with the molecular structure C6H3(NH2)2OH.  It is a dihydrogen chloride salt and is used as a photographic developer. It was introduced as a developing agent for photographic papers in 1892. It is unusual amongst developing agents as it works most effectively in slightly acid conditions rather than the strongly alkaline conditions required for most other developers. As amidol ages it changes color to a dark red-brown. Developing dishes and equipment used to prepare amidol solutions are also frequently stained brown, a stain that is very persistent.

Prints developed in amidol are typically a very warm brown-black colour, but overdevelopment can quickly lead to chemical fogging.

Amidol's color change upon oxidation is used to advantage as a convenient colorimetric method for measuring the dissolved oxygen concentration in water supplies, rivers, etc.

References

Photographic chemicals
Anilines
Phenols